The John Swett Unified School District (JSUSD) is a public school district in Contra Costa County, California. It currently operates one  elementary school, one middle school, and one standard high school and another for Continuing and Alternative education. The current district superintendent is Charles Miller.

Schools
 Rodeo Hills Elementary School, Rodeo, Calif. - Grades K-5
 Carquinez Middle School, Crockett, Calif. - Grades 6-8
 John Swett High School, Crockett, Calif. - Grades 9-12
 Willow High School, Crockett, Calif. - Continuation and Alternative Education

Closed 

 Port Costa School

References

External links
 John Swett Unified School District Official Website

 Rodeo Hills Elementary School (replaced Hillcrest Elementary School, 1951-2004)

 Carquinez Middle School

 John Swett High School

 Willow High School

School districts in Contra Costa County, California